The Burial of the Sardine in Murcia (Entierro de la Sardina en Murcia) since 1851, is a festivity that is celebrated in Murcia (Spain) during the Spring Festival (Fiestas de Primavera de Murcia), whose main event is a parade of floats and men dressing in dresses that culminates with the burning of the sardine on the Saturday after Holy Week.The Burial recalls the old pagan myths. The fire has a cleansing function. It was declared by the Ministry of Industry, Tourism and Trade of Spain as an International Tourist Interest.

References

Web de la Agrupación Sardinera de Murcia

External links 
 El Entierro de la Sardina en Región de Murcia Digital
 Actualidad del Entierro de la Sardina en Especial Fiestas de Primaveras Del diario regional La Verdad
  Del diario digital laverdad.es 
 http://www.regmurcia.com/servlet/s.Sl?sit=c,786,m,3094&r=ReP-19898-DETALLE_REPORTAJESPADRE
 Himno sardinero del Entierro de la Sardina de Murcia
 Murcia: Entierro de la Sardina

Festivals in Spain
Murcia
Tourist attractions in the Region of Murcia
Murcian culture
Spring (season) events in Spain